The Canadian and American Reformed Churches (CanRC) is a federation of Protestant churches in Canada and the United States, with historical roots in the Reformed Churches of the Netherlands. It emphasizes the importance of adherence to Biblical, covenantal, redemptive-historical preaching within the Reformed tradition, and sanctification.

Basic beliefs and doctrine
CanRC churches believe in biblical infallibility. The basis of the preaching and teaching in these churches is the belief that Jesus Christ is both true man and true God and is the long-awaited Messiah who suffered and died for the sins of God's people, and that this demands a thankful response of faith and obedience. Like many other Reformed churches, they teach that salvation is by grace through faith in Jesus Christ alone. They broadly follow Calvinist theology, and have adopted the Three Forms of Unity, a common Calvinist doctrine. 

Upon public profession of faith, members are understood to subscribe to the confessions of the church as faithfully summarizing the doctrine of the Bible. Profession of faith also makes them subject as communicant members to a longer process of church discipline, up to and including excommunication if they are considered delinquent in doctrine or lifestyle. This is ascertained by other members and by the elders through yearly home visits.

History
CanRC was founded by members of the Reformed Churches in the Netherlands (Liberated) (GKV) who immigrated to Canada following World War II. These Dutch immigrants first made contact with already-existing Reformed churches in Canada, especially the Protestant Reformed Churches in America (PRC) and the Christian Reformed Church in North America (CRCNA), in the hope that they could join with them. This was deemed impossible due to theological differences with the PRC, and the CRCNA's sympathy with the Reformed Churches in the Netherlands, which had expelled the GKV in 1944 over a disagreement regarding Abraham Kuyper's view of the covenant.

The Canadian Reformed Churches maintained ecumenical relations with the GKV until tension between the two churches led to an official termination of their relationship by the General Synod of the Canadian Reformed Churches in 2019. Reasons for this decision included disapproval of the GKV's hermeneutics, as well as the GKV's more accepting views regarding women in office, common law couples, and homosexual members.

The first Canadian Reformed congregation was instituted in Lethbridge, Alberta, on April 16, 1950. The same year, churches were instituted in Edmonton and Neerlandia, Alberta; Orangeville, Ontario; and New Westminster, British Columbia. Currently there are over 65 congregations, which can be found in British Columbia, Alberta, Manitoba and Ontario, as well as in the American states of Washington, Michigan and Colorado.

Church government 
Under the assertion that the government of the church must be regulated by the Bible, the Canadian Reformed Churches practice what they call a traditionally Reformed "bottom-up" polity, as opposed to a "top-down" model of church government. This approach to church polity reflects their continental Reformed roots. They say it is both anti-hierarchical and anti-independent, promoting both the autonomy of the local church and the need to cooperate within a federation.

Only male members who have made profession of faith and meet the conditions as set forth in certain Biblical passages (such as 1 Timothy 3 and Titus 1) are eligible for office as pastors, elders, and deacons. Women are not eligible for office. 

The government of the Canadian Reformed Churches is based on the Church Order adopted by the Synod of Dort (1618–1619). The Canadian Reformed Churches have revised the Church Order to reflect changed circumstances, and to incorporate minor improvements. Fundamentally, the revised Church Order follows the principles and structure of the Church Order of Dort. 

The Church Order contains 76 Articles which are divided into four sections dealing with:

 the offices and supervision of doctrine (ministers, missionaries, elders, deacons)
 the assemblies of the church (consistory, classis, regional synod, general synod)
 the liturgy of the church (worship services, sacraments, ceremonies)
 the discipline of the church

The federation is divided first by local consistories, then into eight classical regions, next with two annual regional synods, and finally a general synod. General synod takes place every three years.

Missions

Foreign missions 
All of the churches are also involved, either directly or indirectly, in the work of foreign mission. The Cornerstone Church of Hamilton, Ontario, currently has a missionary working in northern Brazil. The church of Aldergrove, British Columbia, has two missionaries working in northern Brazil. The Bethel Church of Toronto has two missionaries in Papua New Guinea. The church of Smithville, Ontario, has a missionary in West Timor, Indonesia.

Canadian Missions 
A number of years ago, the church at Smithers, BC began a program of outreach among the native people living in the Bulkley Valley region of northern British Columbia. Local outreach to First Nations people by members of the Smithers congregation continues through the work of the local outreach committee, through Sunday schools, teen activities, and Bible camps. Smithers Home Mission has sent a missionary to work in Prince George, B.C., the largest urban centre in Northern British Columbia.

Many churches also support a radio program called The Voice of the Church. It broadcasts fifteen minute messages that can be heard in different parts of Canada..

Ecumenical relations
The Canadian Reformed Churches also have "ecclesiastical fellowship" with a number of Reformed and Presbyterian church federations, including the following:

The Americas:
United Reformed Churches in North America
Reformed Church in the United States
Orthodox Presbyterian Church
L'Église réformée du Québec
Igrejas Reformadas do Brasil

Abroad:
Free Reformed Churches of South Africa
Free Reformed Churches of Australia
Reformed Churches of New Zealand
Presbyterian Church in Korea (Koshin)
Free Church of Scotland
Free Church of Scotland (continuing)
Reformed Churches in Indonesia (GGRI)
Calvinist Reformed Churches in Indonesia (GGRC)
What does a relationship of ecclesiastical fellowship encompass? Without going into all the specifics, it relates to helping each other remain true to the Reformed faith, keeping each other informed about major ecclesiastical decisions, accepting each other’s members, inviting delegates to each other’s assemblies or synods, allowing each other’s ministers to preach the Word, keeping each other informed about relations with other parties.

Education
On the principle that theological education must be maintained by the churches and for the churches, the federation operates the Canadian Reformed Theological Seminary, located in Hamilton, Ontario. 

Covenant Canadian Reformed Teachers College; A teachers college was established in 1981 to train Christian teachers to serve in the field of education. The Canadian Reformed Teachers College Association is formed with representatives from Ontario, Manitoba, Alberta, and British Columbia school societies serving as a Board of Governors. Since opening, the CCRTC has graduated 250 students, many of whom are currently employed by Canadian Reformed schools across Canada. 

Although separate from the denomination, parents within the federation have organized a number of privately funded schools at the elementary and secondary levels across the country. There are currently twenty-eight schools affiliated with the Canadian and American Reformed Churches, including sixteen elementary schools, three highschools, and nine kindergarten-to-grade 12 schools.

References

External links
Official web site for the Canadian and American Reformed Churches
Canadian Reformed Theological Seminary

Reformed denominations in the United States
Reformed denominations in Canada
Christian organizations established in 1950
Calvinist denominations established in the 20th century
1950 establishments in Canada